The Nairobi–Malaba Standard Gauge Railway (SGR) is the project of standard-gauge railway that should connect Kenya's capital city of Nairobi to Malaba, at the international border with Uganda. The Nairobi–Malaba SGR was to connect other standard gauge railways in Uganda, Rwanda, Burundi, South Sudan and eastern Democratic Republic of the Congo, under the East African Railway Master Plan.

The KSh700 billion (US$7 billion) project, was to be built in phases. The only part built is the Nairobi–Naivasha section, which was inaugurated on 16 October 2019. The Naivasha–Kisumu Section was to follow and finally the Kisumu–Malaba Section to conclude the Kenya Standard Gauge Railway System.

As per end of 2022 further extension of standard gauge from Naivasha in the Rift Valley looks unlikely.

Route
This part of the SGR is divided into three sections.

Nairobi-Naivasha section
Designed for passenger and freight traffic, the section was estimated to cost KSh150 billion (US$1.5 billion). China Communication Construction Company was the lead contractor. President Kenyatta inaugurated this section during a celebration at Maai Mahiu SGR Terminus on 16 October 2019. Train stations are located at Ongata Rongai, Ngong, Maai Mahiu, and Suswa, with an interchange station at Nachu. This section crosses Nairobi National Park on a bridge, between Nairobi Terminus and Ongata Rongai stations.

Naivasha-Kisumu section
The design of the project included upgrading the port of Kisumu. This section of the SGR was budgeted at KSh370 (US$3.7 billion), intended to be funded with a loan from Exim Bank of China. With the upgraded port on Lake Victoria and rail transport without break of gauge cargo could have been shipped on the lake to and from Mwanza and Musoma in Tanzania as well as Bukasa, Port Bell and Jinja in Uganda efficiently.

In 2017 an opening of the line, possibly through to Uganda, was predicted for 2020. The plans not materialising due to lack of funding, five years later a project to rebuild the metre gauge line from the Ugandan capital Kampala to the frontier and onwards to the existing Kenyan metre gauge railway found funding from the African Development Bank.

Kisumu-Malaba section
The Exim Bank of China has proposed the funding the Ugandan section Malaba-Kampala. A funding agreement was expected to be signed in September 2018, in Beijing. End of 2019 the standard gauge from Kisumu to Uganda hardly becoming reality, the intention was to connect the Naivasha-Kisumu SGR section to the existing metre gauge railway to Kampala. In December 2022 rehabilitation of the metre gauge from Kisumu to Kampala in Uganda was in progress.

Mombasa–Nairobi Standard Gauge Railway

In 2011, Kenya signed a memorandum of understanding with the China Road and Bridge Corporation to build a standard-gauge railway from Mombasa to Nairobi. The project cost US$3.6 billion. Financing was finalized in May 2014, with the Exim Bank of China extending a loan for 90 percent of the project cost and the remaining 10 percent coming from the Kenyan government.

Laying of the track was completed in December 2016. Passenger service was officially inaugurated on 31 May 2017.

Freight service began commercial operation on 1 January 2018. China Communications Construction Company will operate the railway for the first five years.

Gallery

See also

 Mombasa–Nairobi Standard Gauge Railway
 Kenya Standard Gauge Railway
 Uganda Standard Gauge Railway
 Rwanda Standard Gauge Railway

References

External links
Kenya commits to SGR reaching Malaba

Railway lines in Kenya
Standard gauge railways in Kenya
Chinese aid to Africa